Geranium purpureum, the little-robin, is a species of plant in the genus Geranium.

References

Eliáš, P. jr. 2011: Geranium purpureum Vill. – new alien species to the Slovak flora. Thaiszia journal of botany, 21: 21–28.

purpureum
Flora of Lebanon
Flora of Malta